The 1961 Victorian state election was held on 15 July 1961.

Retiring Members

Liberal and Country
Sir Thomas Maltby MLA (Geelong)
Charles Bridgford MLC (South Eastern)

Country
Frederick Cook MLA (Benalla)
Sir Albert Lind MLA (Gippsland East)

Legislative Assembly
Sitting members are shown in bold text. Successful candidates are highlighted in the relevant colour. Where there is possible confusion, an asterisk (*) is also used.

Legislative Council
Sitting members are shown in bold text. Successful candidates are highlighted in the relevant colour. Where there is possible confusion, an asterisk (*) is also used.

References

Psephos - Adam Carr's Election Archive

Victoria
Candidates for Victorian state elections